Grammatology may refer to:

 Grammatology, the study of writing systems
 Of Grammatology, a work by philosopher Jacques Derrida